986 Amelia (prov. designation:  or ) is a large background asteroid from the outer regions of the asteroid belt, approximately  in diameter. It was discovered on 19 October 1922, by Spanish astronomer Josep Comas i Solà at the Fabra Observatory in Barcelona. The L/D-type asteroid has a rotation period of 9.5 hours. It was named after the discoverer's wife, Amelia Solà.

Orbit and classification 

Amelia is a non-family asteroid of the main belt's background population when applying the hierarchical clustering method to its proper orbital elements. It orbits the Sun in the outer asteroid belt at a distance of 2.5–3.8 AU once every 5 years and 6 months (2,024 days; semi-major axis of 3.13 AU). Its orbit has an eccentricity of 0.20 and an inclination of 15° with respect to the ecliptic.

The body's observation arc begins at the Algiers Observatory in May 1926, more than 3 years after to its official discovery observation at the Fabra Observatory.

Naming 

This minor planet was named after Amelia Solà, wife of the discoverer Josep Comas i Solà (1868–1937). The official  was mentioned in The Names of the Minor Planets by Paul Herget in 1955.

Physical characteristics 

In both the Tholen- and SMASS-like taxonomy of the Small Solar System Objects Spectroscopic Survey (S3OS2), Amelia is a T-type asteroid, while in the SDSS-based taxonomy, the asteroid has been classified as an L-type.

Rotation period and poles 

In October 2000, a rotational lightcurve of Amelia was obtained from photometric observations by American amateur astronomer Robert A. Koff at the Thornton Observatory  in Colorado. Lightcurve analysis gave a well-defined rotation period of  hours with a brightness amplitude of  magnitude.

Diameter and albedo 

The Collaborative Asteroid Lightcurve Link derives an albedo of 0.1183 and a diameter of 50.94 kilometers based on an absolute magnitude of 9.4. An asteroid occultation, observed on 2 November 2006, gave a best-fit ellipse dimension of 51.0 × 51.0 kilometers. These timed observations are taken when the asteroid passes in front of a distant star. However the quality of the measurement is rated poorly.

Notes

References

External links 
 Lightcurve Database Query (LCDB), at www.minorplanet.info
 Dictionary of Minor Planet Names, Google books
 Asteroids and comets rotation curves, CdR – Geneva Observatory, Raoul Behrend
 Discovery Circumstances: Numbered Minor Planets (1)-(5000) – Minor Planet Center
 
 

000986
Discoveries by Josep Comas Solà
Named minor planets
19221019